Shahr-e Qods railway station (Persian:ايستگاه راه آهن شهر قدس, Istgah-e Rah Ahan-e Shahr-e Qods) is located in Shahr-e Qods, Tehran Province. The station is owned by IRI Railway.

References

External links

Railway stations in Iran